Chittoor is a city and district headquarters in Chittoor district of the Indian state of Andhra Pradesh. It is also the mandal and divisional headquarters of Chittoor mandal and Chittoor revenue division respectively. The city has a population of 153,756 and that of the agglomeration is 175,647.

History 
After the Indian independence in 1947, Chittoor became a part of the erstwhile Madras State. The modern Chittoor district was formerly North Arcot district, which was established by the British in the 19th century had Chittoor as its headquarters. On 1 April 1911, the district was split into two - Chittoor district and North Arcot district.

Pre-history 
The district abounds in several pre-historic sites. The surface finds discovered are assigned to special stages in the progress of civilization. Paleolithic tools were discovered at Tirupathi, Sitarampeta, Ellampalle, Mekalavandlapalle, Piler, etc. Mesolithic tools were discovered at Chinthaparthi, Moratavandlapalle, Aruvandlapalle, Tirupathi etc. Remains of Neolithic and ancient tools were unearthed near Bangarupalem. The existence of megalithic culture was revealed by the discovery of burials at Irulabanda, Bapanatham, Valimikipuram (Vayalpadu), Sodum, Velkuru, Nyakaneri, Basinikonda etc.

Political history 
The political history of the district commences with the Mauryas in the 4th century BC. The district of Chittoor was not a homogeneous administrative unit up to 1911. Its component parts were under the control of various principal dynasties at different periods of times, namely, the Mauryas, Satavahanas, Pallavas, Chalukyas of Badami, Rashtrakutas, Cholas, Pandyas, Kakatiyas, Hoysalas, Royal of Vijayanagara, Qutub Shahis, Mughals, Asof Jahis, Marathas, Hyder Ali and Tipu of Mysore, and the British, besides dynasties such as Cholas, Banas, Vaidumbas, Nolambas, Western Gangas, Yadavas, Matlis, Uttama Chola, Andiyaman, Siyaganga rulers, Nawabs of Kadapa and Arcot. The zamindars of Karvetinagar, Srikalahasthi, Punganur and Kangundhi also ruled over this district.

Geography 
Chittoor city lies on the banks of Neeva River at the southernmost part of Andhra Pradesh state. It is located on the NH 69 and NH 40 linking major metropolitan cities of Bangalore and Chennai.

It is located between the northern latitudes of 37" and 14°8" and between the eastern longitudes 78°33" and 79°55". It is bounded on the east by Tirupati district of Andhra Pradesh, on the south by Krishnagiri District , Vellore, Tiruvallur,Thirupattur districts of Tamil Nadu, on the west by Kolar district of Karnataka, and on the north by Annamayya district of Andhra Pradesh. In respect of area it takes the eighth place with an area of 15,150 square kilometers which accounts for 5.51 percent of the total area of the state. The general elevation of the mountainous part of the district is 2500 feet above sea level. Chennai & Bangalore cities are located in 150 km. and 165 km. respectively from Chittoor Town.

Climate

Demographics 
Telugu is the official and widely spoken language. Chittoor has a population of 152,654 and has a sex ratio of 1002 females per 1000 males compared to the state average of 992 females, as of 2011 census. The literacy rate of the city is 90.60%. Chittoor was upgraded as municipal corporation in 2011. And also a large minority of Tamil people live here.

Governance 

Chittoor Municipal Corporation is the civic administrative body of the city. It was constituted as a Grade–III municipality in the year 1917. It was upgraded to Grade–II in 1950, Grade–I in 1965, Special Grade in 1980 and Selection Grade in 2000.

Economy 

Chittoor is the district headquarters and houses many district level government institutions.

Chittoor is predominantly an agro-market place and a major market for mango, grain, sugarcane, and peanut. Other industries include oilseed, poultry and milk. Tomato farming contributing over 20% of the State's production. Ground nut is the most major commercial crop in the district followed by sugarcane and the major horticulture crop of mangoes. 2nd largest milk-producing district with its expansive dairy industries. In the field of dairy, the district stood first in the state. The district is famous also for textile industries like that of silk with 13,000 power looms providing employment 40,000 workers. Granite industry famous for its black, pink and grey granites.

Landmarks 
The Swayambu Varasidhi Vinayakaswamy temple at Kanipakam is the famous notable Hindu temple near the city. Ardhagiri Anjaneyaswamy temple at Aragonda is another notable landmark near the city.

Movie theatres 

 V Mega Vijaya Lakshmi Theatre
 Chanakya Theatre
 Raghava Theatre
 MSR Movie Land
 Sri Gurunatha Theatre(under renovation)
 SDC CINEMAS Ananda Theatre
 SDC CINEMAS Sri Venkateswara Theatre (under renovation)
 Devi Theatre(currently closed)

Education 
The primary and secondary school education is imparted by government, aided and private schools of the School Education Department of the state. The medium of instruction followed by different schools are English and Telugu.

Engineering colleges:
 SITAMS: Sreenivasa Institute of Technology and Management Studies
 Sri Venkateswara College of Engineering Technology, Chittoor
 VEMU : Vemu Institute of Technology
Medical colleges:
 Apollo Institute of Medical Sciences and Research
 P.E.S. Institute of Medical Sciences and Research
 KKC Homoeopathic Medical College 
Others:
 P. V. K. N. Government College.

Transport 

Roadways

The city is well connected to major cities through national and state highways. The National Highways through Chittoor City are, National Highway 40 (India) connecting Chittoor with Kadapa and Kurnool on North and connecting Vellore and Chennai on South National Highway 69 (India) connecting Chittoor with Kolar and Bangalore on West National Highway 140 (India) connecting Chittoor with Tirupati and Nellore on East. The city has total road length of 382.30 km.

Public transport

The Andhra Pradesh State Road Transport Corporation operates bus services from Chittoor bus station. Bus services are operated to Kanipakam, Tirupati, Madanapalle, Punganur, Palamaner, Piler, Puttur, Kuppam, Srikalahasti, Nellore, Vellore, Tiruvannamalai, Salem, Kanchipuram, Chennai, Puducherry, Kolar, Bangalore, Mysore, Kurnool, Kadapa, Anantapur, Hyderabad, Hanumakonda, Warangal, Visakhapatnam, Rajamahendravaram, Kakinada, Vijayawada, Guntur, Tenali, Ongole Amaravati and also to all other major towns and cities in the Chittoor district, Andhra Pradesh, Tamilnadu, Karnataka, Puducherry and Telangana states.

Railways
Chittoor railway station is a National railway station in Chittoor city of Andhra Pradesh. It lies on Gudur–Katpadi branch line section and is administered under Guntakal railway division of South Central Railway zone. Nearest major railway junction is Katpadi Junction railway station Tamil Nadu. Just 30 km South from Chittoor city. There are direct trains daily from Chittoor to Vijayawada, Kakinada, Rajamahendravaram, Guntur, Tenali, Visakhapatnam, Kacheguda (Hyderabad), Bengaluru, Mysuru, Thiruvananthapuram, New Delhi to Kanyakumari HimSagar Express and weekly/biweekly/triweekly trains connect Chittoor with Mannargudi, Jammu, Katra, Tirunelveli, Mangalore, Ernakulam, Visakhapatnam, Rajamahendravaram, Hatia Ranchi, Santragachi (Kolkata) and Jayanthi Janata Express, etc. which run through Chittoor.

Airports

The nearest airports are:

1) Tirupati Airport at Renigunta in Tirupati, Andhra Pradesh, is about 80 kms North. IATA:TIR is at par with other major cities, but flights are operated in a limited fashion.

2) Chennai International Airport. IATA:MAA at Chennai is about 150 kms East

3) Kempegowda International Airport. IATA:BLR at Bangalore is about 185 Kms West

The Infrastructure Corporation of Andhra Pradesh Limited (INCAP) will build Kuppam Airport at Shantipuram Mandal at an estimated cost of Rs 100 crore .

Politics 
Chittoor city spreads over Chittoor assembly (Majority), Puthalapattu assembly (partially) and Gangadhara Nellore assembly (partially) constituencies in Andhra Pradesh. Chittoor is part of Chittoor (Lok Sabha constituency).

Chittoor Assembly Constituency 

 |Year|  |Assembly Constituency|  |Winner Candidates Name|     |Party|     |Votes|	   |Runner UP|	              |Party|     |Votes|
 2019   ---   Chittoor	 ---   	    Jangalapalli Srinivasulu   ---   YSRC  ---  91206 ---  A.S. Manohar            --- TDP   ---    51238
 2014	 ---   Chittoor	 ---        D. A. Sathya Prabha        ---   TDP   --- 	73430 --- Jangalapalli Srinivasulu --- YSRC  ---    66631
 2009	 ---   Chittoor	 ---        C.K.Jayachandra Reddy      ---   INC   --- 	46094 --- Jangalapalli Srinivasulu --- PRP   ---    44384
 2004	 ---   Chittoor	 ---        A.S. Manohar               ---   TDP   --- 	58788 --- C.K. Jayachandra Reddy   --- IND   ---    54900
 1999	 ---   Chittoor	 ---        C.K.Jayachandra Reddy      ---   INC   --- 	62999 --- A.S.Manohar	           --- TDP   ---    48702
 1994	 ---   Chittoor	 ---        C.K. Jayachandra Reddy     ---   INC   --- 	46709 --- A.S. Manohar	           --- TDP   ---    44623
 1989	 ---   Chittoor	 ---        C.K. Jayachandra Reddy     ---   IND   --- 	44972 --- C. Hari Prasad	   --- TDP   ---    26986
 1985	 ---   Chittoor	 ---        R. Gopinathan	       ---   INC   ---	45081 --- Rajasimhulu	           --- TDP   ---    36439
 1983	 ---   Chittoor	 ---        Jhansi Laxmi	       ---   IND   ---	49127 --- N.P.Venkateswara Choudary--- INC   ---    32693
 1978	 ---   Chittoor	 ---        N.P.Venkateswara Choudary  ---   JNP   ---	29941 --- C.V.L. Narayana	   --- INC(I)---    21139
 1972	 ---   Chittoor	 ---        D. Aanjineyulu Naidu       ---   INC   ---	32607 --- K. M. Erriah	           --- DMK   ---    14324
 1967	 ---   Chittoor	 ---        D. Aanjineyulu Naidu       ---   INC   ---	32559 --- P. V. Naidu	           --- SWA   ---    20979
 1962	 ---   Chittoor	 ---        C. D. Naidu	               ---   SWA   ---	35256 --- P. Chinnama Reddy	   --- INC   ---    13301
 1955	 ---   Chittoor	 ---        P. Chinnama Reddy	       ---   INC   ---	17397 --- C.V. Srinivasa Modhaliar --- IND   ---    10456

Notable people 
 
 
N. Chandrababu Naidu –. EX Chief Minister, Chief of TDP
Mohan Babu – Actor
Nallari Kiran Kumar Reddy – Ex Chief Minister
 Talari Manohar – Member of Parliament, Member of Legislative Assembly.
 V. Nagayya – actor
 D. K. Adikesavulu Naidu – Ex MP, Ex Chairman TTD, Founder Vydehi Hospitals, Liquor Baron
Chittoor Subramaniam Pillai – Carnatic musician
 Madhurantakam Rajaram – writer, Sahitya Akademi awardee
 Cattamanchi Ramalinga Reddy – educationist and political thinker, essayist and economist, poet and literary critic.
 Dr. Kesava Reddy – Novelist
 Prathap C. Reddy – founder and chairman of the Apollo group of hospitals

See also 
 List of cities in Andhra Pradesh by population
 List of municipal corporations in Andhra Pradesh

References

External links 

Chittoor official website
Chennai to Kalahastri Tour Package 

 
Mandal headquarters in Chittoor district
Cities in Andhra Pradesh
District headquarters of Andhra Pradesh